The 1987 DFB-Pokal Final decided the winner of the 1986–87 DFB-Pokal, the 44th season of Germany's premier knockout football cup competition. It was played on 20 June 1987 at the Olympiastadion in West Berlin. Hamburger SV won the match 3–1 against second division Stuttgarter Kickers to claim their third cup title.

Route to the final
The DFB-Pokal began with 64 teams in a single-elimination knockout cup competition. There were a total of five rounds leading up to the final. Teams were drawn against each other, and the winner after 90 minutes would advance. If still tied, 30 minutes of extra time was played. If the score was still level, a replay would take place at the original away team's stadium. If still level after 90 minutes, 30 minutes of extra time was played. If the score was still level, a drawing of lots would decide who would advance to the next round.

Note: In all results below, the score of the finalist is given first (H: home; A: away).

Match

Details

References

External links
 Match report at kicker.de 
 Match report at WorldFootball.net
 Match report at Fussballdaten.de 

Hamburger SV matches
Stuttgarter Kickers matches
1986–87 in German football cups
1987
1980s in West Berlin
Football competitions in Berlin
June 1987 sports events in Europe
Sports competitions in West Berlin